Igor Anatolyevich Skalin (born 12 January 1970) is an  Olympic sailor. He won silver medal in the Soling class at 1996 Summer Olympics.

References

External links
 
 

1970 births
Living people
Russian male sailors (sport)
Olympic sailors of Russia
Olympic silver medalists for Russia
Olympic medalists in sailing
Sailors at the 1996 Summer Olympics – Soling
Medalists at the 1996 Summer Olympics
Soling class world champions